Gregorio Peak is a  mountain summit located in the Valhalla Ranges of the Selkirk Mountains in British Columbia, Canada. The mountain's name commemorates Michael Gregory, a resident of the Slocan area known to his friends as Gregorio, who drowned in a canoeing accident on Slocan Lake in 1971 returning from a climb of nearby Devils Couch. This peak's name was submitted by Anthony Eweson of New Denver for consideration, and it was officially adopted March 4, 1974, by the Geographical Names Board of Canada.

Based on the Köppen climate classification, Gregorio Peak has a subarctic climate with cold, snowy winters, and mild summers. Temperatures can drop below −20 °C with wind chill factors  below −30 °C. Precipitation runoff from the mountain drains into Gwillim Creek and Hoder Creek, both tributaries of the Slocan River. Its nearest higher peak is Lucifer Peak,  to the north-northeast. The first ascent of the peak was made August 25, 1970, by Bob Dean and Howie Ridge.

See also

Geography of British Columbia

References

External links
 Weather forecast: Gregorio Peak  

Two-thousanders of British Columbia
Selkirk Mountains
Kootenay Land District